Camille Lacourt (born 22 April 1985) is a retired French competitive swimmer and backstroke specialist. He won the 50 metre backstroke at three consecutive world championships (2013 Barcelona, 2015 Kazan, and 2017 Budapest). He competed at the 2012 Olympics in the 100 metre backstroke and finished fourth. In the 2016 Rio Olympics, he finished fifth in the same event.

Swimming career

2010: breakthrough year
Lacourt collected three gold medal at the European Championships. He became European Champion in the 100 m backstroke (long course) ahead of compatriot Jérémy Stravius in a time of 52.11. This time was a new European record and the second fastest time ever, second to Aaron Peirsol's 51.94 from 2009. He collected the 50 m backstroke title in a time of 24.07, also bumping him up to the second fastest performer of all time in that event. On the final night, he collected gold in the 4 × 100 m medley relay.

Following years
Lacourt collected a series of medals at the World Championships in the following years: one gold and one silver in 2011 in Shanghai, two gold in 2013 in Barcelona, and one of each medal in 2015 in Kazan. He finished 4th in the 100 metre backstroke at the 2012 Summer Olympics and failed to win any medals. After missing the 2014 European Championships due to a hip injury, he won two golds at the 2016 European Championships.

Lacourt failed to win any medals at the 2016 Summer Olympics. Following his 5th-place finish in the 100 meter backstroke, Lacourt made international news after criticizing the sport of swimming and making disparaging remarks about Chinese swimmer Sun Yang. In a post-race interview with French radio station RMCsport, Lacourt said: "I am very sad when I see my sport getting like this. I have the impression I am looking at athletics, with two or three doped in each final. I hope that FINA is going to react and stop this massacre, because it is getting sad," and finished with "Sun Yang, he pisses purple!" After being defeated by another Chinese swimmer, Xu Jiayu, who won the silver medal in the 100 meter backstroke, Lacourt said, "I don't like being beaten by a Chinese."

Lacourt won his third consecutive gold medal in the 50 m backstroke at the 2017 World Championships. He then announced his retirement later in 2017.

Personal life
Lacourt was married to Valérie Bègue, who won Miss France 2008. He is the father of a girl, Jazz, born in October 2012. Lacourt and Bègue divorced in 2016.

Personal bests (long course)

See also
List of French records in swimming

References

1985 births
Living people
People from Narbonne
French male backstroke swimmers
World Aquatics Championships medalists in swimming
Olympic swimmers of France
Swimmers at the 2012 Summer Olympics
Swimmers at the 2016 Summer Olympics
Medalists at the FINA World Swimming Championships (25 m)
European Aquatics Championships medalists in swimming
Sportspeople from Aude
Mediterranean Games silver medalists for France
Mediterranean Games medalists in swimming
Swimmers at the 2009 Mediterranean Games
20th-century French people
21st-century French people